Dalnekonstantinovsky District is an administrative district (raion), one of the forty in Nizhny Novgorod Oblast, Russia. Municipally, it is incorporated as Dalnekonstantinovsky Municipal District. It is located in the center of the oblast. Its administrative center is the urban locality (a work settlement) of Dalneye Konstantinovo. Population: 22,474 (2010 Census);  The population of Dalneye Konstantinovo accounts for 21.3% of the district's total population.

History
The district was established in 1929.

Notable residents 

Kuzma Alekseyev, leader of Teryukhan unrest in 1806-1810, proclaimed himself a prophet. Known as "Kuzya-the-God", lived in Teryukhan Mordvin village of Makrasha
Dmitri Kiselev (born 1989 Dalnekonstantinovo), ice dancer

References

Notes

Sources

Districts of Nizhny Novgorod Oblast
States and territories established in 1929
 
